The Da Ke ding is an ancient Chinese bronze circular ding vessel from the Western Zhou dynasty (1046–771 BC). Unearthed in Famen Town, Fufeng County, Shaanxi in 1890, it is on display in the Shanghai Museum.

The Da Ke ding, the Da Yu ding in the National Museum of China, and the Mao Gong ding in the National Palace Museum in Taipei have been called the "Three Treasures of China".

Description
The tripod is round, with three legs and two ears, a common shape during the Western Zhou dynasty (1046–771 BC). Its mouth was engraved with Taotie patterns and its abdomen was engraved with wave patterns, and its ears was engraved with Chinese dragon patterns.

Inscription
The tripod has 290 Chinese characters in 28 lines inside the tripod. The inscriptions recorded that the monarch of the Western Zhou dynasty awarded slaves and land to the nobleman, Ke. Ke cast it to commemorate his ancestors and the glory bestowed by the king, and the process of awarding is described in detail in the inscription on the inner wall. These inscriptions give us the opportunity to understand the etiquette and land system of the Zhou Dynasty three thousand years ago.

History

In 1890, namely the 16th year of Guangxu period (1875–1908) in the Qing dynasty (1644–1911), the tripod was excavated from a cellar in Famen Town, Fufeng County, Shaanxi, with more than 1,200 bronze wares, including seven Xiao Ke ding and a set of Bianzhong. After hearing the news, Ke Shaotai, a Tianjin collector bought it immediately.

Pan Zuyin (1830–1890), a politician and collector spent a huge amount of money on the tripod. Before he bought Da Ke ding, he has already got the Da Yu ding, the largest bronzeware of the Western Zhou dynasty. Therefore, Pan became the top of collectors home and abroad for bronze wares. It's known to the world that three treasures in the world, these two tripods brought great credit to the Pan family. Pan specially built an exquisite pavilion in his house, which he named "Pangu Pavilion" to preserve the two tripods. Pan couldn't get a son to inherit his family property. After his death,  his younger brother Pan Zunian (1870–1925) inherited the family property. Before Pan Zunian died, his granddaughter-in-law kneeled in front of him and promised to protect the tripod unless she died. Then he nodded his head and died. At that time, the males of the Pan family all died off. The 19-year-old Pan Dayu (1906–2007) took responsibility of protecting the tripods and other cultural relics.

In 1937, the Second Sino-Japanese War broke out. Pan Dayu risked her relatives to go back to the house in Suzhou. They asked a carpenter to make a big wooden box. At night, it was dark everywhere in Suzhou. Under candlelight, they lifted the bricks under the long table and dug a big hole. The big box was put into the hole with the two tripods crossing inside. They closed the box, earthed it up and replaced the bricks. Shortly afterwards, Suzhou was occupied by the Japanese army. Matsui, the Japanese commander, heard that there were two tripods in the Pan's house. It was exactly him that sent a Japanese division to Pan's house to plunder the two tripods. One day, a truck fully loaded with Japanese soldiers stopped in front of a house in South Gravel Street. The Japanese soldiers unloaded the heavy water bump from the truck and pumped the water in the lotus pond completely. Then they jumped into the muddy pond and dug every corner of the pond with shovels. They dug till sun set but got nothing. Since then, they rushed into Pan's house every day to search something. Pan Dayu kept the two tripods with her family for decades. They lived through the trouble times eventually.

In 1951, two years after the Communist State was established, the Shanghai Cultural Relics Management Committee began to organize the Shanghai Museum. After getting the news, Pan Dayu wrote a short letter, intending to donate the two tripods to Shanghai Museum. A few months later, Liu Ruli and Shen Gengmei went to Suzhou accompanied by Pan Jiahua, daughter of Pan Dayu, to take the tripods. Mao Dun (1896–1981), the Minister of Culture, personally inscribed an honorary credential for her. The Da Ke ding has always been kept there since that time. In 1959, the Da Yu ding was transferred to Beijing and became one of the most valuable treasure in National Museum of China. In March 2004, in order to celebrate Pan Dayu's 100 birthday, the Da Yu ding was transferred to Shanghai Museum for a special and short display. It's their reunion for half a century.

On January 21, 2018, the Da Ke ding was featured on the Chinese TV program National Treasure. Jackson Yee, Xu Yongxiang and Pan Yuyi, presented the historical background of Da Ke Ding.

See also
 List of Chinese cultural relics forbidden to be exhibited abroad

References

External links
 
 
 
 
 
 

History of Baoji
Collection of the Shanghai Museum
Zhou dynasty bronzeware
1890 archaeological discoveries
Dings